Henri Gabriel Mulet (17 October 1878 – 20 September 1967) was a French composer, pipe and reed organist, and cellist.

Biography
Mulet was born on 17 October 1878 in Paris. His father Gabriel Léon Mulet was choirmaster of the Basilica of Sacré-Cœur, where his mother Blanche Victoire Augustine Gatin would also play the harmonium; as a boy he sometimes deputised for her. He studied at the Paris Conservatoire from 1890, where his teachers included Jules Delsart, Raoul Pugno, Xavier Leroux, Alexandre Guilmant and Charles-Marie Widor. He originally intended to be a cellist, but later served as an organist at Saint-Pierre-de-Montrouge and also taught at the École Niedermeyer and the Schola Cantorum, where he worked with his friend Vincent d'Indy. From 1922 to 1937 he was organist at St. Phillippe du Roule.

Mulet's most notable works are for organ:  the Esquisses byzantines (1914-1919)  and the Carillon-Sortie (1911/12). The former, a set of ten pieces, was a recollection of the Romano-Byzantine architectural style of Sacré-Cœur and five of the pieces are named after some of its features, including "Campanile" (bell-tower) and "Chapelle des Morts" (chapel of the dead). The Carillon has been called "one of the great showpieces of French Romantic organ music". Mulet's complete organ works were recorded in a set of two CDs in 1989, played by Paul Derett.

In 1922 Mulet published "Les tendances et antireligieuses néfastes de l'orgue moderne", an attack on modern schools of organ building; this was followed by similar essays. He deplored the trend to create organs which he felt were more appropriate for the cinema than for church: the organ was "a stained-glass window. Its tones of imposing and embracing calm flood the air of our cathedrals, in the same way that ...stained-glass windows bring down meditation upon the congregation."

In 1937, Mulet, following a financial crisis, destroyed his manuscripts and many of his possessions and left Paris for Draguignan (Var). There he continued as a church organist until 1958, often in poverty (his wife opened a toy-shop in the hope of increasing their income). Ill-health led Mulet and his wife, Isabelle-Emilie-Marie (née Rochereau) to retire to a convent in Draguignan, where he died in 1967.

Works
Mulet's compositions include:

Organ 
Méditation religieuse, 1896?
Prière, 1902?
Carillon-Sortie, Procure Générale, 1911 or 1912?
Offertoire funèbre
Petit offertoire - Maurice Senart, 1912 reprinted by Edition: "Le Grand Orgue"
Sortie douce - Maurice Senart, 1912 reprinted by Edition: "Le Grand Orgue"
Offertoire sur un Alléluia grégorien, pour la fête du Très-Saint-Rosaire
Esquisses Byzantines (10 pieces), 1914–19, including the popular Tu es petra ("Thou art the rock")

Harmonium
Angelus (a transcription of his earlier orchestral work "San Salvator").
Offertoire
Sortie

Orchestral
Dans la vallée du tombeau (Souvenir de Lombardie), symphonic poem, 1908
La Toussaint, symphonic poem, 1909
Fantaisie pastorale, 1911
Paysage d’hiver
Paysages crépusculaires
Scherzo-Marche
Petite suite sur des airs populaires français
Souvenirs de Lombardie

Vocal
O mon Jésus (hymn), 1900
L’aigu bruissement, voice and piano, 1904
Laudate dominum, four voices and organ, 1904
Soleils couchants, voice and piano, 1904
Ave Maria, three voices & organ, 1910
Les deux étoiles, voice and piano, 1910
Le dernier des Maourys, voice and piano, 1911
Le talion, voice and orchestra, 1912 (on a text by LeConte de Lisle).

Chamber and instrumental
Danse afghane, piano, 1904
2 noëls, oboe or clarinet & piano, 1904
Danse persane, piano, 1910
Petit lied très facile, harpsichord or piano, 1910

Essays
Les tendances et antireligieuses néfastes de l'orgue modern. Congres General de Musique Sacree, Strassbourg 26-31 Juillet 1921.
Étude sur le role des mutations et la composition rationelle du Plein-Jeu dans un grand orgue, Strassbourg 26-31 Juillet 1921.

References
 Notes

Sources
Bate, Jennifer (1980). "Mulet, Henri", in The New Grove Dictionary of Music and Musicians, ed. S. Sadie, vol.12, pp. 766–7. 
 Nickol, Christopher (1989). "Complete Mulet". The Musical Times, Vol. 130, No. 1757, . 
Plender, Aidan (October 1981). "Henri Mulet, 1878-1967". The Musical Times, Vol. 122, No. 1664, . 
Simeone, Nigel (2000). Paris--a Musical Gazetteer, . Yale University Press. 
Dimitroulis Ioannis (2012) "Mulet, Henri", in Henri Mulet, ed. Flu Press Gerd Numitor (Ed.) 
Further reading
Duchesneau, Michel (1997). L'avant-garde musicale et ses sociétés à Paris de 1871 à 1939. Sprimont: Editions Mardaga
Sabatier, F (1991) ‘Henri Mulet’, Guide de la musique d’orgue, ed. G. Cantagrel (Paris), 605–6 
Smith, Rollin (1999). Louis Vierne: Organist of Notre-Dame Cathedral, note 171. Pendragon Press.

External links
 Ioannis Dimitroulis, "Henri Mulet", in Classicalcomposers.org website. Retrieved via Wayback Machine 18 October 2017.
 Henri Mulet: A biography by Ioannis Dimitroulis, 

1878 births
1967 deaths
20th-century French composers
French male composers
French classical organists
French male organists
Musicians from Paris
Conservatoire de Paris alumni
Academic staff of the Schola Cantorum de Paris
20th-century French male musicians
Male classical organists